Hyoseong of Silla (r. 737–742, died 742) was the 34th to rule the Korean kingdom of Silla.  He was the second son of King Seondeok and Queen Sodeok.

Hyoseong took the daughter of the pajinchan Yeongjong as a concubine.  This led to palace strife, as the jealous queen killed the concubine and Yeongjong plotted to kill her.  Hyoseong had Yeongjong put to death.

After he died in 742, Hyoseong was cremated to the south of Beomnyusa temple, and his ashes were buried in the Sea of Japan (East Sea).

Family 

 Grandfather Sinmun of Silla (r. 681–692) (김정명)
 Grandmother: Queen Sinmok of the Kim clan (신목왕후 김씨;d. 700)
 Father: Seongdeok of Silla  (reigned 702–737) (성덕왕)
 Mother: Queen Sodeok (소덕왕후 김씨), of the Kim clan
 Wife:
Queen Park, of the Park clan (왕후 박씨) 
Queen Hyemyeong, of the Kim clan (혜명왕후 김씨)
Concubine Park, of the Park clan (후궁 박씨)

See also
Unified Silla
List of Korean monarchs
List of Silla people

References

Silla rulers
742 deaths
Year of birth unknown
8th-century Korean monarchs